Long Reach or Longreach may refer to:

Places
Long Reach, Columbia, Maryland, United States
Long Reach, Kent, UK
Long Reach, at Gravesend, Kent, UK
Long Reach, West Virginia, United States
Longreach, Queensland, Australia
Long Reach, Tasmania, Australia, near Bell Bay

Other uses
Operation Long Reach, part of the 1965 Pleiku Campaign in the Vietnam War